Nicholas James (born 17 September 1986) is an English cricketer. He is a left-handed batsman and a slow left-arm bowler who is currently without a club.

While studying at King Edward VI Aston in Birmingham James made his debut for the Warwickshire Second XI in September 2004, with whom he played for three seasons and competed in the 2005 Second XI Trophy. James then joined the Warwickshire First XI and represented the county in the 2006 C&G Trophy, though Warwickshire finished second to last in the table that season and thus did not progress to the second round of the competition.

During the Spring of 2006, James also represented Staffordshire in the MCCA Trophy.

Towards the end of the 2009 Cricket season James was taken on trial by Glamorgan. After successful performances in the Pro40 league James was signed by the Welsh county.

In 2011, James signed a new two-year contract with Glamorgan, taking him up to the end of the 2013 season.

In the 2013 season, James only appeared for Glamorgan in the Twenty 20 playing 8 out of Glamorgan's 10 games in total. He was released at the end of the season.

Career best performances
as of 1 October 2013

External links
Nicholas James at ESPN Cricinfo
Nicholas James at ECB Player Profiles

References

1986 births
English cricketers
Living people
Warwickshire cricketers
Staffordshire cricketers
Glamorgan cricketers
Wales National County cricketers